Seri Begawan Religious Teachers University College (Arabic: جامعة سري بڬاوان التربية الدينية ; Malay: Kolej Universiti Perguruan Ugama Seri Begawan; abbreviated: KUPU SB) was introduced in August 2007 by Sultan Hassanal Bolkiah. It is the fourth university in Brunei.

External links
Seri Begawan Religious Teachers University official website

Educational institutions established in 2007
Universities and colleges in Brunei
2007 establishments in Brunei